Connecticut's 134th House of Representatives district elects one member of the Connecticut House of Representatives. It encompasses parts of Fairfield and Trumbull and has been represented by Democrat Sarah Keitt since 2023.

List of representatives

Recent elections

2020

2018

2016

2014

2012

References

134